Alucita microscopica is a moth of the family Alucitidae. It was first described by Thomas Bainbrigge Fletcher in 1910 and is found in Sri Lanka.

References

Moths described in 1910
Alucitidae
Moths of Sri Lanka